Polar Park may refer to:
 Polar Park (animal park), a wildlife park in the municipality of Bardu in Troms county, Norway
 Polar Park (baseball park), a baseball park in Worcester, Massachusetts

See also
 Polar Bear Provincial Park, in Ontario, Canada
 Polar Caves Park, in New Hampshire